Male Romantic Friendship, in the nineteenth century, can be understood as intimate relations between young men that were similar to romances.  These relations were based on expressiveness and trust. The parts involved shared their insecurities, doubts, and hopes. These friendships provided the feeling of security and affection that men needed after leaving boyhood.

The romantic aspect of these friendships is the result of the way that men interacted with each other. They used overly romantic language in their diaries and letters when talking about their friends, and they described physical contact, like kisses. These aspects of romantic friendships lead some readers to believe that these friendships had some sexual component; but, it is impossible to prove or disprove these affirmations by only reading the diaries and correspondences.

Development 
These intimacy bonds were usually formed in the transition period between boyhood and manhood During this period, middle-class men left their homes to go to colleges and the military. Away from their families and friends, young men had to form a deeper affinity with colleagues to help them navigate this new phase of their lives. Young men search for friends who had similar interests and who could offer emotional support when needed. They freely declared their affection to one another, especially by using physical contact. Even though these friendships started at colleges, some of them continue after graduation.

Comparison of female and male romantic friendships 

Authors claim that this kind of friendship is similar to the same-sex friendship between women described in The Female World of Love and Ritual. For instance, Rotundo argues that male romantic friendship, like same-sex female friendship, was socially accepted, compatible with heterosexual marriage, and  valued. On the other hand, men's and women's friendships differ in duration. Smith-Rosenberg says that female romantic friendships were generally formed in adolescence and continue during the rest of their life. Nevertheless, male romantic friendship usually lasted only during youthhood.

Sexual activity 
The intense manner that young men addressed each other in their letters makes some readers question if sexual activity was present in Romantic Friendships. In these correspondences, men talked about embracing each other, sleeping together, and the happiness generated by receiving a letter from their friends. These passages may suggest that these relations were more than friendships. Nevertheless, behaviors of that era explain some of the actions described that seemed peculiar for present-day people. For instance, in the 1800s, it was common for middle-class men to share a bed, and physical contact in these circumstances was inevitable. Moreover, the lack of heating made body contact a source of warmth that could be considered a pleasure. So, the fact that two men slept together did not necessarily mean that they had sexual relations.

References 

Romantic and sexual partners